Parodi is a 2007 Indian Kannada-language action film directed by Om Sai Prakash. The film stars Upendra and Neha. It is a remake of the Hindi film Krantiveer (1994). The film was released on 27 February 2007.

Plot

Cast 
Upendra as Vijay
Neha as Bharathi
Pradeep Rawat
Umashree
Rangayana Raghu as a money lender
Sathyajit
 Mansi
Sadhu Kokila
Tennis Krishna

Production 
The film had its final phase of shooting in Bangalore in December 2006. Upendra and Hindi actors Neha and Pradeep Rawat were cast in the lead.

Soundtrack 
The music was composed by Rajesh Ramanath. Upendra wrote the lyrics and sung for a song in the film. The other songs were written by M. N. Vyasa Rao, Sriranga, and Rudramurthy Shastry.

Reception 
A critic from The Hindu opined that "The director attempts to exercise his hold on the audience in a liberal fashion, undermining the latter's sensibility". R G Vijayasarathy of Rediff.com gave the film a rating of one out of five stars and opined that "The ineptness of this film is, in short, such that even a popular star like Upendra can do nothing for its prospects at the box office". A critic from Sify gave the film a verdict of below average and said that "This is a poorly made film with nothing new in the offering. Bizarre films with similar content seem to the order of the day in Kannada!" The film was a box office failure.

References

External links 

Indian action films
Kannada remakes of Hindi films
Films scored by Rajesh Ramnath
2000s masala films
Films directed by Sai Prakash